Wakefield is a settlement in Jamaica. It has a population of 2,694 as of 2009.

References

Populated places in Trelawny Parish